John Merrill may refer to:

 John Merrill (marathon walker), British sportsman
 John Merrill (Medal of Honor) (1843–1883), awarded the U.S. Medal of Honor, 1879
 John Merrill (American politician) (born 1963), American politician from Alabama
 John O. Merrill (1896–1975), American architect and structural engineer
 John P. Merrill (1917–1984), American physician, researcher and Harvard professor
 John C. Merrill, American professor
 John Merrill (MP) (died 1734), British government official and politician

See also
 Jon Merrill (disambiguation)